The 1994–95 Campionato Sammarinese di Calcio season was the 10th season since its establishment. It was contested by 10 teams, and S.P. Tre Fiori won the championship.

Regular season

Results

Championship playoff

First round
S.S. Cosmos 2-3 S.P. La Fiorita
S.S. San Giovanni 0-3 F.C. Domagnano

Second round
S.S. San Giovanni 0-1 S.S. Cosmos
F.C. Domagnano 0-2 S.P. La Fiorita

Third round
F.C. Domagnano 2-4 S.S. Cosmos
S.P. Tre Fiori 0-0 (pen  6-5 ) S.P. La Fiorita

Fourth round
S.P. La Fiorita 1-0 S.S. Cosmos

Final
S.P. Tre Fiori 1-0 S.P. La Fiorita

References
San Marino - List of final tables (RSSSF)

Campionato Sammarinese di Calcio
San Marino
1994–95 in San Marino football